Glenn McGrath, a retired international Australian cricketer, took a number of five-wicket hauls during his career. In cricket, a five-wicket haul (also known as a "five–for" or "fifer") refers to a bowler taking five or more wickets in a single innings. This is regarded as a notable achievement, and fewer than 40 bowlers have taken more than 15 five-wicket hauls at international level in their cricketing careers.

McGrath made his Test debut in November 1993, against New Zealand, but it was not until March 1995 that he took his first five-wicket haul in Australia's victory over the West Indies in Barbados; his performance earned him the man of the match award. He followed that three weeks later with six wickets in a defeat in Trinidad. McGrath took 10 of his 29 Test five-wicket hauls in The Ashes (the traditional name for Test matches between Australia and England).  During the 1997 Ashes series, McGrath "humiliated" England, taking eight wickets in a single innings at Lord's and restricting England to 77, the lowest total in any Test match at the ground since 1888. A month later, he dismissed seven English batsmen in the first innings at The Oval but despite these performances, Australia did not win either Test match. The 2001 Ashes series saw McGrath make four five-wicket hauls in consecutive matches. He twice took five-wicket hauls in both innings of a Test match – in March 1999 he dismissed five West Indian batsmen in each innings of the first Test of the Frank Worrell Trophy; in the following year, he took ten wickets against India at the Sydney Cricket Ground.

Having made his One Day International (ODI) debut in December 1993, McGrath took his first one-day five-wicket haul in the following year, in the final of the Will's Triangular Series against Pakistan. Australia won each of the seven ODI matches in which McGrath took a five-wicket haul, and McGrath was given the man of the match award on six of these occasions.  Retiring from international cricket in 2007, he took 29 five-wicket hauls in Test cricket and 7 in ODIs.  As of October 2009, he is fifth overall in all-time Test five-wicket haul takers, and fourth in the ODI list.

Key

Tests

One Day Internationals

References

External links

Australian cricket lists
Lists of international cricket five-wicket hauls by player